The 2012 Torneo Omnia Tenis Ciudad Madrid was a professional tennis tournament played on clay courts. It was the second edition of the tournament which was part of the 2012 ATP Challenger Tour. It took place in Madrid, Spain between 24 and 30 September 2012.

Singles main draw entrants

Seeds

 1 Rankings are as of September 17, 2012.

Other entrants
The following players received wildcards into the singles main draw:
  Iván Arenas-Gualda
  Enrique Lopez-Perez
  Roberto Ortega-Olmedo
  Jaime Pulgar-Garcia

The following players received entry as an alternate into the singles main draw:
  Jan-Lennard Struff

The following players received entry from the qualifying draw:
  Aleksandr Lobkov
  Jaroslav Pospíšil
  Nick van der Meer
  Alexander Ward

Champions

Singles

 Daniel Gimeno Traver def.  Jan-Lennard Struff, 6–4, 6–2

Doubles

 Daniel Gimeno Traver /  Iván Navarro def.  Colin Ebelthite /  Jaroslav Pospíšil, 6–2, 4–6, [10–7]

External links
Official Website

 
Torneo Omnia Tenis Ciudad Madrid
Torneo Omnia Tenis Ciudad Madrid
Madrid
Torneo Omnia Tenis Ciudad Madrid